Globalization and Health is a peer-reviewed open-access public health journal that covers the topic of globalization and its effects on health.  The editors in chief are Greg Martin and Ronald Labonté. The journal is affiliated with the London School of Economics (LSE Health)

History 
Globalization and Health was the first open access global health journal available when it came out in 2005. It offers an international platform for original research, knowledge sharing, and debate on the topic of globalisation and its effects on health.

Abstracting and indexing 
The journal is abstracted and indexed in PubMed Central, CABI, EMBASE, and Scopus.

Journal sections 
Globalization and Health publishes articles under the following sections; Development, Disease, Economics and trade, Environment, Governance for health, Health in foreign policy, Health systems, Migration and mobilities, Psychosocial impacts, Theory, models and methods.

References

External links 
 

Public health journals
BioMed Central academic journals
Publications established in 2005
English-language journals
Creative Commons Attribution-licensed journals
Globalization-related journals
Open access journals